HMS Cotswold was a Type I  destroyer of the Royal Navy which served in World War II. She was scrapped in 1957.

Service history
Cotswold was ordered on 11 April 1939 under the 1939 War Emergency Build Programme as job number 1836. She was completed in November 1940. She was adopted by the civil community of North Cotswold Urban District in Gloucestershire as part of Warship Week in 1942.

She earned battle honours during the Second World War for the North Sea 1941–1945, where she spent the majority of her service. During 1942 she struck a mine off Ordfordness, and was subsequently repaired in HM Dockyard, Chatham. In June 1944 she formed part of the Naval escort force in support of the Normandy Landings.

Following the war she was transferred to the Reserve Fleet at Portsmouth in June 1946, transferring to Harwich in 1958. She remained there until sold to Thos. W. Ward for scrap. She arrived at the breakers yard at Grays, Essex on 1 September 1957.

References

Publications
 
 

 

1940 ships
Maritime incidents in April 1942
Naval ships of Operation Neptune